Modris is a Latvian masculine given name, borne by more than 2,500 men in Latvia. The name means "watchful" or "vigilant". Its nameday is celebrated on 21 September.

The name is one of the relatively few surviving Latvian names of indigenous origin from among the great number revived or introduced during the Latvian National Awakening of the late 19th and early 20th centuries.

Individuals
Modris may refer to:

Modris Eksteins (born 1943), Latvian-Canadian historian
Modris Liepiņš (born 1966), Latvian race walker
Modris Tenisons (born 1945), Latvian mime

Sources
 Pilsonības un Migrācijas Lietu Parvalde (PMLP): Office of Citizenship and Migration Affairs personal name database

References

 Siliņš, K., 1990: Latviešu personvārdu vārdnīca. Rīga: Zinātne 

Latvian masculine given names